East Pond is a small lake east-southeast of Old Forge in Herkimer County, New York. It drains south via an unnamed creek that flows into Limekiln Creek.

See also
 List of lakes in New York

References 

Lakes of New York (state)
Lakes of Herkimer County, New York